Ectephrina is a genus of moths in the family Geometridae.

Species
 Ectephrina semilutata (Lederer, 1853)

References
 Ectephrina at Markku Savela's Lepidoptera and Some Other Life Forms
 Natural History Museum Lepidoptera genus database

Geometridae